The 2009–10 Meistriliiga was a season of the Meistriliiga, the top professional ice hockey league in Estonia.

Teams

Three teams participated in the 2009–10 edition of the Meistriliiga:
Kohtla-Järve Viru Sputnik
Narva PSK
Tartu Välk 494

Standings

References

External links
 Meistriliiga 

Est
Meistriliiga
Meistriliiga (ice hockey) seasons